Mutual recognition occurs when two or more countries or other institutions recognize one another's decisions or policies, for example in the field of conformity assessment, professional qualifications or in relation to criminal matters. 
A mutual recognition agreement (MRA) is an international agreement by which two or more countries agree to recognize one another's conformity assessments, decisions or results (for example certifications or test results). A mutual recognition arrangement is an international arrangement based on such an agreement.

Countries involved in the agreement can designate for the scope of the agreement Conformity Assessment Bodies (CAB), laboratories and inspection bodies.

MRAs have become increasingly common since the formation of the World Trade Organization in 1995. They have been forged within and among various trade blocs, including APEC and the European Union.

MRAs are most commonly applied to goods, such as various quality control MRAs. However, the term is also applied to agreements on the recognition of professional qualifications and decisions relating to criminal matters.

Accreditation Bodies, under the International Accreditation Forum, use the term Multilateral Recognition Agreements in a similar sense.

Mutual recognition of decisions in criminal matters
The issue of mutual recognition in criminal matters was raised at the European Union's Cardiff European Council on 15 and 16 June 1998 and further discussed at the European Council meeting held in Tampere in October 1999. A programme of EU measures to implement the principle of mutual recognition in relation to decisions regarding criminal matters was published on 15 January 2021.

See also
 Testing, inspection and certification
 Harmonisation of law
 Home state regulation

References

External links
 Managed Mutual Recognition Regimes: Governance Without Global Government by Kalypso Nicolaïdis and Gregory Shaffer
TACD Background Paper on MRAs
National Institute of Standards and Technology on its MRAs
Public Citizen description of MRAs

Commercial treaties
Quality control
Globalization